Bon deh is a village in Tamin Rural District, in the Mirjaveh of Zahedan County, Sistan and Baluchestan Province, Iran. At the 2006 census, its population was 229, in 45 families.

References 

Populated places in Zahedan County